Obey is the third album by Swedish noise rock band Brainbombs. It was initially released in 1996 through the Swedish record labels Releasing Eskimo and Slow Dance, then released on vinyl format in the US in 1997. Many reissues released through Armageddon Records have surfaced since, on both CD and vinyl formats. The album's cover shows a photograph of American murderer Ed Gein. The first 35 seconds of the album are recorded from a Kawai MS710 keyboard demonstration track.

Track listing

 "Kill Them All" – 5:43
 "Die You Fuck" – 5:32
 "Anal Desire" – 4:56
 "Lipstick on My Dick" – 4:34
 "Drive Around" – 5:04
 "To Hurt" – 5:02
 "Obey" – 7:19
 "Fuckmeat" – 6:16

Release history

References

External links
 

1995 albums
Brainbombs albums